A barrel roof is a curved roof that, especially from below, is curved like a cut-away barrel. They have some advantages over dome roofs, especially being able to cover rectangular buildings, due to their uniform cross-section.

Barrel vaults are a particular form of barrel roof.

See also 
 List of roof shapes

References 

Roofs